Algeria national under-20 football team (Arabic:منتخب الجزائر الوطني تحت 20 سنة), represents Algeria in association football at an under-20 age level and is controlled by the Algerian Football Federation, the governing body for football in Algeria. The current coach is Mohamed Lacete.

Achievements
FIFA U-20 World Cup
Quarterfinals (1): 1979
Africa U-20 Cup of Nations: 1
Champion (1): 1979
Third Place (3): 1981, 1983, 1989
UNAF U-20 Tournament
Runners-up (4): 2007, 2009, 2011, 2012
Third Place (3): 2005, 2010, 2019
Arab Cup U-20
Runners-up (2): 1985, 2021
Fourth place (1): 2012

Tournament Records

FIFA U-20 World Cup record

Africa U-20 Cup of Nations record

UNAF U-20 Tournament record

Mediterranean Games Record

Prior to the Athens 1991 campaign, the Football at the Mediterranean Games was open to full senior national teams.
 Algeria participated with the national B team in 1975 and 1987.

Arab Cup U-20 Record

Current squad
 The following players were called up for the 2023 Africa U-20 Cup of Nations qualification matches.
 Match dates: 18–24 October 2022
 Opposition: ,  and 
Caps and goals correct as of: 8 June 2022, after the match against

Notable players
 Salah Assad
 Lakhdar Belloumi
 Baghdad Bounedjah
 Rabah Madjer
 Djamel Menad
 Hocine Yahi
 Chaabane Merzekane

Past squads
 1979 FIFA World Youth Championship squad

See also
 Algeria national football team
 Algeria national under-23 football team
 Algeria national under-17 football team
 Algeria national under-15 football team

References

External links
 FIFA U-20 World Cup website

under-20
Youth football in Algeria
African national under-20 association football teams